Parciau is a hamlet in the community of Llaneugrad, Anglesey, Wales, which is 136 miles (218.9 km) from Cardiff and 215 miles (346.1 km) from London.

References

See also 
 List of localities in Wales by population

Villages in Anglesey